Guy Frederick Byam-Corstiaens (died 3 February 1945) was a British journalist and sailor.

Byam lost the sight in his right eye in the incident, having swum through oil to be rescued.

Due to his injuries Byam was released from his duties and worked for an engineering company before joining the BBC in November 1942 as a sub-editor in their French Service. In April 1944 Byam joined the BBC's War Reporting Unit which covered Operation Overlord. On D-Day Byam jumped with paratroopers into occupied France. Byam was later part of the Public Relations team under Major R. W. Oliver that was present at the Battle of Arnhem alongside fellow BBC reporter Stanley Maxted and newspaper reporters Alan Wood of the Daily Express and Jack Smyth of Reuters.

Byam was killed when the plane from which he was reporting, the Rose of York, was shot down over Germany during a daylight air raid on Berlin in February 1945. Byam was one of two BBC reporters who were killed during the Second World War.

References

1945 deaths
BBC newsreaders and journalists
Journalists killed while covering World War II
Royal Naval Volunteer Reserve personnel of World War II
Victims of aviation accidents or incidents in Germany
British civilians killed in World War II